"Stupid Things" is a song by Yo La Tengo, released as a single in 2012 on Matador Records.

It was released as MP3 and FLAC downloads and as a limited edition run of 1500 copies in 45 RPM 12" vinyl.

The song is remixed by EYE of Boredoms.

Track listing

References

2012 singles
Yo La Tengo songs
2012 songs